Waltham is a city in Middlesex County, Massachusetts, United States, and was an early center for the labor movement as well as a major contributor to the American Industrial Revolution. The original home of the Boston Manufacturing Company, the city was a prototype for 19th century industrial city planning, spawning what became known as the Waltham-Lowell system of labor and production. The city is now a center for research and higher education, home to Brandeis University and Bentley University as well as industrial powerhouse Raytheon Technologies. The population was 65,218 at the census in 2020.

Waltham has been called "watch city" because of its association with the watch industry. Waltham Watch Company opened its factory in Waltham in 1854 and was the first company to make watches on an assembly line. It won the gold medal in 1876 at the Philadelphia Centennial Exposition. The company produced over 35 million watches, clocks and instruments before it closed in 1957.

History

Waltham was first settled in 1634 as part of Watertown and was officially incorporated as a separate town in 1738. Waltham had no recognizable town center until the 1830s, when the nearby Boston Manufacturing Company gave the town the land that now serves as its central square.

In the early 19th century, Francis Cabot Lowell and his friends and colleagues established in Waltham the Boston Manufacturing Company—the first integrated textile mill in the United States, with the goal of eliminating the problems of co-ordination, quality control, and shipping inherent in the subcontracting based textile industry. The Waltham–Lowell system of production derives its name from the city and the founder of the mill.

The city is home to a number of large estates, including Gore Place, a mansion built in 1806 for former Massachusetts governor Christopher Gore, the Robert Treat Paine Estate, a residence designed by architect Henry Hobson Richardson and landscape architect Frederick Law Olmsted for philanthropist Robert Treat Paine, Jr. (1810–1905), and the Lyman Estate, a  estate built in 1793 by Boston merchant Theodore Lyman.

In 1857, the Waltham Model 1857 watch was produced by the American Watch Company in the city of Waltham, Massachusetts.
In the late 19th and early 20th century, Waltham was home to the brass era automobile manufacturer Metz, where the first production motorcycle in the U.S. was built.

Another first in Waltham industrial history involves the method to mass-produce the magnetron tube, invented by Percy Spencer at Raytheon. During World War II, the magnetron tube technology was applied to radar. Later, magnetron tubes were used as components in microwave ovens.

Waltham was also the home of the Walter E. Fernald State School, the western hemisphere's oldest publicly funded institution serving people with developmental disabilities. The storied and controversial history of the institution has long been covered by local and, at times, national media.

Timeline 

 1703 – Grove Hill Cemetery established.
 1738 – Town of Waltham incorporated from Watertown, Massachusetts.
 1755 – Part of Cambridge annexed to Waltham.
 1793 – The Vale (residence) built.
 1810 – Waltham Cotton and Wool Factory Company formed.
 1813 – Boston Manufacturing Company in business.
 1820
 First Congregational Church founded.
 Manufacturers' Library active.
 Waltham Bleachery built.
 1827 – Rumford Institute organized.
 1833 – The Hive newspaper begins publication.
 1835 – Waltham Bank established.
 1837 – Methodist Episcopal Church organized.
 1849
 Part of Newton annexed to Waltham.
 Christ Episcopal Church built.
 1851 – Tornado.
 1852 – Baptist Church organized.
 1853 – Waltham Gas Light Company incorporated.
 1854 – American Horologe Company relocates to Waltham.
 1856 – Waltham Sentinel newspaper begins publication.
 1857
 Waltham and Watertown Railroad constructed.
 Mount Feake Cemetery established.
 Waltham Agricultural Library Association formed.
 1859 – Town of Belmont separates from Waltham.
 1863 – Waltham Free Press begins publication.
 1865 – Public Library founded.
 1866 – Emmet Literary Association formed.
 1870
 Waltham Horological School established.
 Waltham Foundry Co. established.
 1876
 Waltham Weekly Record begins publication.
 Davis & Farnum Manufacturing Company in business.
 1879 – Leland Home for aged women established.
 1880 – Music Hall built.
 1881 – Emery Wheel Company in business.
 1882 – Parmenter Crayon Company chartered.
 1884
 City of Waltham incorporated.
 Harrington Block built.
 1885
 Board of Trade organized.
 Waltham Hospital founded.
 Waltham Training School for Nurses established.
 1886 – Robert Treat Paine Estate built.
 1888 – Sesquicentennial.
 1890
 Population: 18,707.
 Massachusetts School for the Feeble-Minded relocates to Waltham.
 1891 – O'Hara Waltham Dial Company organized.
 1893
 Waltham Evening News begins publication.
 Waltham Manufacturing Company established.
 Beaver Brook Reservation and Charles River Reservation established.
 1894
 Linden Street Bridge constructed.
 Waltham Bicycle Park opens.
 1902 – Metz Company in business.
 1908 – Company F State Armory built.
 1910 – Population: 27,834.
 1915 – Waltham Historical Society incorporated.
 1924 – Waltham News Tribune newspaper in publication.
 1928 – Middlesex College of Medicine and Surgery relocates to Waltham.
 1933 – First Parish Church rebuilt.
 1935 – Gore Place Society founded.
 1936 – Hovey Players (theatre group) founded.
 1938 – County Courthouse built.
 1941 – Waltham Garden Club founded.
 1948 – Brandeis University established.
 1961 – Rose Art Museum founded at Brandeis University.
 1968
 Bentley University relocates to Waltham.
 WBRS on air.
 1970 – Population: 61,582.
 1971
 Waltham Museum established.
 Robert Drinan becomes Massachusetts's 3rd congressional district representative.
 1975 – Aerosmith musical group rents Wherehouse.
 1976 – Waltham Mills Artists Association open studios begins (approximate date)
 1980 – Charles River Museum of Industry established.
 1982 – Parexel International Corporation headquartered in Waltham.
 1985 – Waltham Philharmonic Orchestra formed.
 1987 – Joseph P. Kennedy II becomes Massachusetts's 8th congressional district representative.
 1988 – Global Petroleum Corporation headquartered in Waltham (approximate date).
 1995 – Steinway Musical Instruments, Inc. headquartered in Waltham.
 1996
 Lionbridge Technologies Inc. headquartered in Waltham.
 City website online.
 1999 – Waltham Land Trust incorporated.
 2003 – Raytheon Company and Roving Software Inc. headquartered in Waltham.
 2004
 Jeannette A. McCarthy becomes mayor.
 Brandeis University's Schuster Institute for Investigative Journalism nonprofit established.
 2006 – Thermo Fisher Scientific Inc. headquartered in Waltham.
 2007
 PerkinElmer, Inc. headquartered in Waltham.
 Waltham Symphony Orchestra formed.
 2010 – Population: 60,632.
 2011
A triple homicide occurs on September 11.
Watch City Steampunk Festival begins.
 2013 – Katherine Clark becomes Massachusetts's 5th congressional district representative.

Pronunciation

The name of the city is pronounced with the primary stress on the first syllable and a full vowel in the second syllable, though the name of the Waltham watch was pronounced with a reduced schwa in the second syllable: . As most would pronounce in the British way, "Walthum", when people came to work in the mills from Nova Scotia, the pronunciation evolved. The "local" version became a phonetic sounding to accommodate French speakers who could not pronounce in the British way. In some areas, the city is referred to as "The Waltham".

Geography
The heart of the city is Waltham Common, which is home to the City Hall and various memorial statues. The Common is on Main Street, which is home to several churches, the Waltham Public Library and Post Office.

The city stretches along the Charles River and contains several dams. The dams were used to power textile mills and other endeavors in the early years of the industrial activity.

Neighborhoods
Waltham has several neighborhoods or villages, including:

 Angleside
 Banks Square
 The Bleachery (named after the former Waltham Bleachery and Dye Works)
 Cedarwood
 The Chemistry (named after the former Newton Chemical Company)
 Ellison Park
 Gardencrest
 Headyland
 The Highlands
 The Island (formerly Morse Meadow Island)
 Kendal Green (mostly in Weston)
 Kendall Park
 Lakeview
 The Lanes
 Northeast
 The North Side
 Piety Corner
 Prospectville (defunct in 1894, now under Cambridge Reservoir)
 Rangeley Acres
 Ravenswood
 Roberts
 Rock Alley
 The South Side
 Warrendale
 West End
 Wildwood Acres

Adjacent towns
It is bordered to the west by Weston and Lincoln, to the south by Newton, to the east by Belmont and Watertown, and to the north by Lexington.

Demographics

As of the census in 2020, there were 65,218 people and 23,891 households in the city. The population density was 5,117.9/mile². According to 2021 census estimates, the racial makeup of the city was 70.5% White, 7.6% Black or African American, 0.5% Native American or Alaska Native, 11.8% Asian, 0.0% Pacific Islander, 5.3% from other races, and 4.3% from two or more races. Hispanic or Latino of any race were 14.3% of the population.

There were 23,891 households, 19.8% of which included children under the age of 18 and 28.4% with people 65 and older. 39.7% of households were married couples living together, 9.9% cohabitating couples, 21.2% male householders with no partner present, and 29.2% female householders with no partner present. The average household size was 2.29 and the average family size was 3.02.

32.7% of households spoke a language other than English at home.

The age distribution is as follows: 13.7% under 18, 20% from 18 to 24, 30.6% from 25 to 44, 9.9% from 45 to 64, and 14.6% 65 or older. The median age was 34. The population was 48.3% male and 51.7% female.

The median income for a household was $95,851, and per capita was $44,977. In 2020, 9.2% of the population and 5% of families lived below the poverty line. 11.7% of those under 18 and 8.45% of those 65 and older lived below the poverty line.

Foreign-born residents
As of 2020, 26.6% of Waltham residents were born outside of the United States. Of foreign-born residents, 41.5% were born in Asia, 32.7% in Latin America, 11.9% in Europe, and 9.7% in Africa.

Economy

Among the companies based in Waltham are the defense contractor Raytheon, medtech corporation PerkinElmer, biopharmaceutical services provider Paraxel, energy supply company Global Partners, data services provider Lionbridge, Steel Connect, broker-dealer Commonwealth Financial Network, technology companies Care.com and StudentUniverse, research and development organization Education Development Center, Inc. (EDC),  provisioner of scientific instrumentation Thermo Fisher Scientific, and the marketing firm Constant Contact. Footwear manufacturer Wolverine World Wide, Inc. moved their regional headquarters from Lexington to the CityPoint campus in July 2016. C & J Clark America, Inc. moved their headquarters from Newton to the Polaroid site in October 2016. Retail activity is concentrated on Main Street, Moody Street, Lexington Street, River Street, parts of Route 60, and the First Avenue area. New retail development has also been active at a former Polaroid site.

Top employers
According to the city's 2018 Comprehensive Annual Financial Report, the top ten non-city employers in the city are as follows.

Arts and culture

Waltham's combination of population (especially in central and south Waltham) parks, public transit, stores, and trails gives it 62 (out of 100) walkability ranking on walkscore.com. This is often reflected downtown and along the Charles Riverwalk, which is often crowded on summer nights by people fishing, jogging, or walking off a meal at one of the many restaurants.

Moody Street in downtown Waltham offers its own brand of entertainment with a colorful assortment of shops, restaurants, and bars, including Outer Limits, Gourmet Pottery, and Lizzy's Ice Cream. Moody Street's booming nightlife, convenience to the commuter rail and lower rents have attracted younger professionals to Waltham in growing numbers in recent years. Moody Street is also referred to as "Restaurant Row" and has become a destination because of the number, variety and quality of its locally owned restaurants. The city of Waltham has a free "Tick Tock Trolley" on Thursday, Friday and Saturday evenings from 6pm–11pm for visitors that provides easy access to local municipal parking lots.

Starting in 2020, the City of Waltham in Massachusetts has shut down a large portion of the main road, Moody St., to vehicular traffic from May 1 until October 31 annually. Moody Street is lined with restaurants and other small businesses but typically has high volumes of automobile passage. In an effort to assist these businesses in a difficult time, the Waltham Traffic Commission closed off a segment of the road to allow businesses to have outdoor dining and storefronts amidst the COVID-19 pandemic. Bus stops that would typically be on the blocked off part of Moody St. are temporarily relocated to nearby spots.

Moody Street is a wide road, and with its closure, many residents of Waltham have begun walking the length of the closure frequently to get outdoors. Waltham has a high immigrant population, and a high population of people without cars. Providing a space that is for pedestrians and cyclists only has increased the number of chance encounters residents have, hence improving social connections. Many restaurants have brought in tents with lighting, while others just bought picnic tables and umbrellas and set them outside. Some restaurants have brought in green spaces or features, creating a biophilic experience for those passing by or eating. These changes have overarching public health benefits for local residents utilizing the space.

Additionally, the Moody St. closure has had a traffic calming effect on surrounding traffic, as it requires street furniture and closures. The shift of Moody St. from an automobile road to a pedestrian road for a significant share of the year challenges the automobility paradigm by reclaiming the space for pedestrians. Without the barrier effect that cars often have on Moody Street, the street is open and enjoyable to walk around. The dense rows of restaurants and other businesses lining the road make for an engaging experience for people who walk the street during the street closure.

Restaurants are supportive of the closure, as they can offer outdoor seating and increase their capacity for business. However, Moody Street has a variety of other businesses like small grocery stores, clothing stores, and jewelers. Some of these non-restaurant business owners oppose repeating the plan in the future, arguing that closing off the road makes their businesses less accessible due to a lack of automobile access. While Waltham has included a variety of stakeholders in the process of the street closure, it is crucial that they continue to do so in order to continue using a democratic process for city-wide decision-making.

For over 25 years, the Waltham Arts Council has sponsored "Concerts On Waltham Common", featuring a different musical act each week of the summer, free of charge to attendees. "Concerts On Waltham Common" was created and organized by Stephen Kilgore until his death in 2004.

Waltham's cultural life is enriched by the presence of two major universities and a number of arts organizations throughout the city.

The Rose Art Museum at Brandeis University is devoted to modern and contemporary art. The Rose holds a variety of exhibitions and programs, and collections are free and open to the public.

The city's history is also celebrated at a number of museums, monuments, and archives. The Charles River Museum of Industry & Innovation, the Waltham Watch Factory historic district, the Gore Estate, the Lyman Estate, and the Robert Treat Payne Estate are among the most well known of the 109 sites in the city on the National Register of Historical Sites. Many festivals are held at these sites each year, such as the annual sheep shearing festival at the Gore Estate. The National Archives and Records Administration Northeast regional branch is located in Waltham. The Waltham Public Library has extensive archives regarding the city's history. The Waltham Museum is devoted solely to the history of the city. Mark Gately is the only stakeholder left of the Waltham Museum.

Waltham is known for its embracing of literary arts. Local author Jessica Lucci has written a series of books about Waltham which can be found at the Waltham Museum, The Waltham Historical Society, and many other regional establishments devoted to promoting literary arts.

The Waltham Mills Artists Association is located in one of the former factories of the Boston Manufacturing Company. The WMAA Open Studios takes place each year on the first weekend of November. The 76 artists of the WMAA open their homes and studios to the public. Works of all media imaginable are demonstrated, displayed and discussed.

The Waltham Philharmonic Orchestra, a civic symphony of the MetroWest area, began in 1985 under the direction of local musicians David J. Tierney and Harold W. McSwain, Jr.  With almost 60 professional, semi-professional, and amateur musicians, the orchestra's mission is to provide the Waltham community with the opportunity to perform in and attend classical concerts of the highest quality. WPO musicians come from Waltham as well as from Boston and surrounding communities. The ensemble includes players of a wide range of ages and professions.

There are five to six concerts throughout the season, including one that features the winner of the annual Youth Concerto Competition, which provides opportunities for young musicians to perform solo works with the WPO. Annual concerts have included summer Concerts on the Common and the December Holiday Pops.

Waltham is home to the Waltham Symphony Orchestra, a high-level semi-professional civic orchestra. The 55 piece orchestra performs five concerts each season at the Kennedy Middle-school Auditorium. Its music director is French-born American conductor, Patrick Botti.
Open space in the city is protected by the Waltham Land Trust.

Waltham embraces its ethnic diversity in a number of festivals. The annual Latinos en Acción Festival celebrates the many Puerto Rican, Mexican, Peruvian, and Guatemalan residents. It is held by Latinos in Action, a local nonprofit group that helps the Latino population register to vote, understand the laws and find scholarships. The festival includes a parade, music, food, and a beauty pageant.

Waltham has in recent decades become a center for Ugandan culture, with an estimated 1500 Ugandans living in the city, leading some to call Waltham "Little Kampala". The Ugandan North America Association is headquartered in Waltham, along with St. Peters Church of Uganda Boston, as well as Karibu, a well regarded Ugandan eatery. Wilberforce Kateregga, a Ugandan immigrant to Waltham has since established Waltham College Uganda, a boarding school for over 300 orphans and children affected by AIDS. The school was named in honor of Kateregga's new home city.

Points of interest

 Gore Place
 Lyman Estate
 Robert Treat Paine Estate
Charles River Museum of Industry & Innovation
 Prospect Hill – third-highest point in the region (after two of the Blue Hills)
 Charles River – Riverwalk on Moody St.
 Embassy Cinema
 A. Wherehouse
 Rose Art Museum
 Metropolitan State Hospital (Massachusetts)
 Norumbega Tower
 American Waltham Watch Company Historic District

Government

Waltham is governed by a mayor and a city council. The current mayor is Jeanette A. McCarthy. There are 15 members of the city council, each elected to two-year terms in non-partisan elections. The current president of the city council is Paul J. Brasco.

The city is in Massachusetts's 5th congressional district and is currently represented in the United States House of Representatives by Katherine Clark. Waltham is also represented in the Massachusetts House of Representatives by State Representative John J. Lawn and State Representative Thomas M. Stanley, and in the Massachusetts Senate by Senator Michael Barrett.

Mayors of Waltham

 Jeannette A. McCarthy, 2004– 
 David F. Gately, 1999–2003
 William F. Stanley, 1985–1999
 Arthur Clark, 1968–1984.
 Austin D. Rhodes 1959
 Paul V. Shaughnessy 1956–1958
 Henry A. Turner, 1953–1955
 Chauncey Cousens, 1949–1952 
 John Devane, 1942–1948 
 Arthur A. Hansen 1938–1942  
 Frederick L. MacDonald 1937
 Henry W. Beal, 1922–1927  
 George Raynolds Beal 1917–1922 
 Eben J. Williams, 1915–1917 

 Thomas K. Keans, 1913–1915 
 Patrick J. Duane 1911–1913; 1930–1933
 Edward A. Walker, 1908–1911 
 John L. Harvey, 1904–1908  
 Murray D. Clement, 1902–1904 
 Mahlon Leonard, 1901–1902 
 George L. Mayberry 1898–1901 
 Charles Bond  1897–1898 
 Arthur Lyman 1896–1897 
 Henry Milton 1895–1896 
 Erskine Warden 1892–1895 
 George L. Mayberry 1890–1891
 Henry N. Fisher 1887–1889 
 Charles F. Stone 1886 
 Byron B. Johnson (first mayor) 1884

Education

Public schools
The Waltham Public Schools system includes seven elementary schools (Northeast, Fitzgerald, MacArthur, Plympton, Whittemore, Stanley, and the Waltham Dual Language Elementary School), two middle schools (McDevitt, Kennedy), and one senior high school (Waltham High School).

Waltham High School's sports teams had been referred to as the Watchmen and the Crimson, before they changed the name to the Hawks.

Private schools

 Chapel Hill – Chauncy Hall School
 Gann Academy – The New Jewish High School of Greater Boston
 Our Lady's Academy (formally Our Lady Comforter of the Afflicted School) (Pre-K through 8)
 Saint Jude School (Pre-K through 8) closed in 2019

Higher education

Waltham is home to:
 Bentley University
 Brandeis University
 Center for Digital Imaging Arts at Boston University which closed in 2014.

Media
Waltham is home to the Waltham News Tribune (formerly The Daily News Tribune), a weekly paper which is published each Thursday, year-round owned by Gatehouse Media. The Waltham Patch covers the local, daily news and invites locals to post their own blogs, events and opinion online only. In 2018, Waltham writer Jessica Lucci was chosen as the "Mayor" of Waltham Patch. WCAC-TV is the cable access and provides opportunities for community members to learn how to create their own local-interest television programming. Waltham news sometimes appears in The Boston Globe'''s GlobeWest section, as well.

Waltham was formerly the home of classical radio station WCRB (99.5 FM), which relocated to the WGBH studios in Brighton in 2006. Brandeis University runs a low-power station, WBRS (100.1 FM).Purchasing magazine, published 1915 to 2010.

Infrastructure
Transportation
Waltham is close to several U.S. interstate highways. Interstate 95, multiplexed with Route 128, runs through the western part of the city. Exits in Waltham are 26, 27, and 28. Interstate 90, which is also the Massachusetts Turnpike, is just to the south in Newton, Massachusetts. Due to its proximity to the center of the Greater Boston metropolitan area, a number of state highways are within a few miles.

The MBTA commuter rail has two stops in Waltham as part of the Fitchburg-Boston Line: one in Central Square Waltham across from the City Hall and one near Brandeis University.

MBTA bus service also covers the city, including routes 61, 70, 170, 505, 553, 554, 556 and 558.

The Charles River runs through Waltham, and bike and walking paths cover most of the south bank, as well as part of the north bank from Prospect Street to Moody Street. Some commuters ride the path to offices in Cambridge and Boston.

Fire department
The city of Waltham is protected by the 166 full-time, paid firefighters of the city of Waltham Fire Department (WFD).  Established in 1816, the Waltham Fire Department is currently organized into three divisions of operations: fire suppression, fire prevention, and training.

Emergency Medical Services
Armstrong Ambulance Service currently provides 24/7 Advanced Life Support emergency medical services to the City of Waltham.

Notable people

 Luther Atwood, chemist in the oil industry
 Keith Aucoin, hockey forward for New York Islanders
 F. Lee Bailey, lawyer
 Nathaniel Prentice Banks, Union General in the Civil War, 24th Governor of Massachusetts, Speaker of the United States House of Representatives
 Anya Battaglino, professional hockey player in the National Women's Hockey League (NWHL)
 Mackenzy Bernadeau, guard for NFL's Dallas Cowboys
 Suzanne Brockmann, author
 Nellie Marie Burns (–1897), actor and poet
 Annie Payson Call, author
 Rob Chiarelli, multiple Grammy Award winner
 JP Dellacamera, play-by-play commentator of Major League Soccer for ABC and ESPN
 Ryan Gallant, professional skateboarder
 Alan Griffin, professional basketball player for the Newfoundland Growlers of the Canadian Elite Basketball League
 James N. Hallock, scientist, known for his work on the Columbia Accident Investigation Board
 John Peabody Harrington, ethnologist and linguist
 Sophie Chantal Hart, professor at Wellesley College
 Lorenza Haynes (1820–1899), librarian, minister, school founder, suffragist, writer
 Clarence Hobart, six-time national doubles champion in tennis; born in Waltham
 Abbie Hoffman, born in Worcester, MA; author, radical political activist, founder of the Youth International Party
 C. D. Howe, WWII and postwar Canadian politician; Waltham native
 Gail Huff, television reporter for WCVB-TV, wife of Scott Brown, former U.S. Senator from Massachusetts

 Deena (Drossin) Kastor, Olympic bronze medal-winning marathon runner
 Pauline R. Kezer, Secretary of the State of Connecticut (1991–1995); born and raised in Waltham
 John Leary, Major League Baseball first baseman and catcher for the St. Louis Browns
 Jeff Lazaro, former Boston Bruins forward
 Samuel Livermore, United States Senator from New Hampshire
 Mel Lyman, musician, filmmaker, writer and founder of the Fort Hill Community
 John Lynch, Governor of New Hampshire
 Shawn McEachern, Boston Bruins forward
 Paul Moody, Inventor, developer of cotton loom; namesake of Moody St. in downtown Waltham
 Angelo Mosca, former Canadian Football League player and professional wrestler
 Richard Thomas Nolan, Episcopal Church Canon, writer, philosophy and religion professor, LGBT advocate
 Dave Pino, member of the band Powerman 5000
 Ida Annah Ryan, first woman to earn a master's degree in architecture (from M.I.T.)
 Evelyn Sears, U.S. Open tennis champion
 Fred Smerlas, NFL defensive lineman with Buffalo Bills, San Francisco 49ers, and New England Patriots
 Caroll Spinney, puppeteer; performed the roles of Big Bird and Oscar the Grouch on Sesame Street Edward Royal Warren, naturalist and engineer
 Mary Watson Whitney, astronomer, Vassar professor of astronomy, Vassar observatory director
 Bob Weston, American bass guitarist and music producer, known for his work in the minimalist rock band Shellac
 Chris Wilson, guitarist for the Flaming Groovies and The Barracudas
 Gordon S. Wood, recipient of the 1993 Pulitzer Prize for History
 Franz Wright, Pulitzer Prize–winning poet
 Paramahansa Yogananda, author of Autobiography of a Yogi built his first ashram in America here

See also
 Greater Boston
 Mayor-council government
 New Covenant Church of Cambridge
 Norumbega
 List of mill towns in Massachusetts

References

Further reading

 Barry, Ephraim L., City of Waltham, Massachusetts. 1887.
 Federal Writers' Project, "Waltham," in Massachusetts: a Guide to its Places and People. Federal Writers' Project, 1937.
 Eaton, Percival R., "Works of the Watch City," New England Magazine, May 1906.
 Gitelman, Howard M., Workingmen of Waltham: Mobility in American Urban Development, 1850–1890. (Baltimore: Johns Hopkins Press, 1974).
 Hurd, D. Hamilton, "Waltham," in History of Middlesex County, Massachusetts. W. Lewis and Co., 1890.
 Starbuck, Alexander. "Waltham," in Samuel Adams Drake (ed.), History of Middlesex County, Massachusetts.  vol. 2, pp. 407–433.1879–80.
 Toomey, Daniel P., "Waltham," in Massachusetts of Today. Boston: Columbia Publishing Co., 1892.
 "Waltham," in Anthony's Standard Business Directory and Reference Book of Woburn, Winchester, Arlington, Lexington, Belmont, Watertown, Waltham, Newton, Massachusetts.'' Anthony Publishing Co., 1898.
 Directory of...Waltham and Watertown. W.A. Greenough & Co., 1887.

External links

 Waltham Historical Society
 
 

 
Cities in Massachusetts
Populated places established in 1634
Cities in Middlesex County, Massachusetts
1634 establishments in Massachusetts